FHH could stand for:
 Familial hypocalciuric hypercalcemia
 Calcium-sensing receptor
 The Free and Hanseatic City of Hamburg